Jorge Campos Navarrete (born 15 October 1966) is a Mexican former professional footballer who played as a goalkeeper.

A notable player of Mexico in the 1990s and early 2000s, Campos was an eccentric player, known for his constant play outside the penalty area – often functioning as a sweeper-keeper, as well as his acrobatic, risky, and flamboyant style of goalkeeping, and his colourful playing attire. His main strengths as a goalkeeper were his leaping ability, athleticism, and speed when rushing off his line, as well as his ability to organize his defense, which enabled him to overcome his short stature. He was regarded as one of the best goalkeepers of his generation.

Campos also made for an effective striker, an uncommon example of versatility in football that is rarely seen in today's game. At times, he would start a game in goal, and transfer upfield later in the match, mostly at the club level. In total, he scored 35 goals throughout his career, scoring all but one while playing for UNAM. His trademark, self-designed bright kits contributed to his popularity.

Club career
Born in Acapulco, Campos started his career in 1988 in Mexico with Pumas. At that time the club's first string goalkeeper was Adolfo Ríos, so because Campos desired first-team opportunities, he asked to be used as a striker. He performed notably in his first season, scoring 14 goals and contending for the title of top-goal scorer. In the following seasons he earned the position of first-choice goalkeeper and won the 1990–91 championship with Pumas.

He also won the championship with Cruz Azul in the Primera División de México Invierno 1997 (México First Division Winter 1997), although he was the second string goalkeeper to Óscar Pérez. He was regularly used as a substitute striker during this period.

As well as Pumas and Cruz Azul, Campos also played for such clubs Atlante, Tigres, and Puebla. He scored a notable bicycle kick goal for Atlante in the 1997 season. In that game, he started as goalkeeper, but as the forwards were failing to score a goal, the coach replaced a field player with another goalkeeper to send Campos to the attack.

He also played in the United States, where he starred in Major League Soccer's first three seasons for the Los Angeles Galaxy and Chicago Fire. He was the first major foreign star to be signed by the league, and enjoyed considerable popularity in the United States. Campos played in back-to-back matches during a double-header event at the Rose Bowl on 16 June 1996, playing for Mexico against the United States and then the Galaxy against Tampa Bay.

International career
On the international stage, Campos started as goalkeeper for Mexico in two FIFA World Cup tournaments: 1994 and 1998. He was also called up to the 2002 FIFA World Cup but he did not play in the tournament. He would eventually collect 129 caps.

At the 1999 New Year's Cup in Hong Kong, in which Mexico was invited as well as Egypt and Bulgaria, Campos' father was kidnapped in Mexico and Campos returned to Mexico to attend to the matter.
Campos was invited several times to play with the Rest of the World Team against clubs like Real Madrid, Barcelona, and Milan. His last game with Mexico was in 2004 in a friendly against Tecos.

He was selected as one of 3 overage players on the Mexico Olympic team at the 1996 Summer Olympics.

Media

Campos has appeared in commercials for the American sportswear company Nike. In 1996, wearing a black jersey (in contrast to the colorful jerseys he wore in games), Campos starred in a Nike commercial titled "Good vs Evil" in a gladiatorial game set in a Roman amphitheatre. Appearing alongside football players from around the world, including Ronaldo, Paolo Maldini, Eric Cantona, Luís Figo and Patrick Kluivert, they defend "the beautiful game" against a team of demonic warriors, before it culminates with Cantona striking the ball and destroying evil.

Campos has appeared in EA Sports' FIFA video game series, featuring in the Classic XI  for 2010 FIFA World Cup South Africa, FIFA 11, FIFA 12, FIFA 13, FIFA 15 and FIFA 16. He also appeared in FIFA 22's Ultimate Team section, as a FUT Heroes Card.

Campos is also a commentator for TV Azteca.

Career statistics

Honours
UNAM
Mexican Primera División: 1990–91
CONCACAF Champions' Cup: 1989

Cruz Azul
Mexican Primera División: Invierno 1997

Chicago Fire
MLS Cup: 1998
U.S. Open Cup: 1998

Mexico
FIFA Confederations Cup: 1999
CONCACAF Gold Cup: 1993, 1996

Individual
Mexican Primera División Golden Glove: 1990–91, 1991–92, 1992–93, 1993–94, 1994–95
IFFHS World's Best Goalkeeper Bronze Ball: 1993
MLS All-Star: 1996, 1997, 1998
Liga MX Trajectory: 2015–16

See also
List of men's footballers with 100 or more international caps
List of goalscoring goalkeepers

References

External links

International statistics at rsssf

1966 births
1993 Copa América players
1993 CONCACAF Gold Cup players
1994 FIFA World Cup players
1995 King Fahd Cup players
1995 Copa América players
1996 CONCACAF Gold Cup players
Living people
Sportspeople from Acapulco
Footballers from Guerrero
Mexican footballers
Association football goalkeepers
Association football forwards
Club Universidad Nacional footballers
Atlante F.C. footballers
LA Galaxy players
Cruz Azul footballers
Chicago Fire FC players
Tigres UANL footballers
Club Puebla players
Liga MX players
Major League Soccer players
Major League Soccer All-Stars
Olympic footballers of Mexico
Mexico international footballers
Footballers at the 1996 Summer Olympics
1998 FIFA World Cup players
1999 Copa América players
1999 FIFA Confederations Cup players
2002 FIFA World Cup players
CONCACAF Gold Cup-winning players
FIFA Confederations Cup-winning players
FIFA Century Club
Mexican expatriate footballers
Mexican expatriate sportspeople in the United States
Expatriate soccer players in the United States